San Pablo de las Salinas is the second-largest colonia in Tultitlán Municipality in the State of Mexico, Mexico. The neighborhood is part of the Mexico City metropolitan area and had a 2010 census population of 189,453 inhabitants, or 36.15% of the municipal population. The town lies near the northern tip of the Federal District (Distrito Federal). It is the third-largest locality in Mexico that is not a municipal seat (after Ojo de Agua, Tecámac Municipality, and Buenavista, also in Tultitlán Municipality). 

The neighborhood of Granjas San Pablo was founded in 1957, the first family that moved to Granjas San Pablo was Don Antonio Lopez-Araiza y Padilla and her wife Consuelo Villegas de Araiza, Daughters Guillermina Araiza Garcia, Nancy Araiza Martinez, Abel Araiza, Antonio Araiza y Carlos Araiza.

References

External links
Ayuntamiento de Tultitlán Official website of the Municipality of Tultitlán

Populated places in the State of Mexico
Tultitlán